Yagnelis Mestre (born October 24, 1983 in Havana) is a Cuban judoka, who played for the half-middleweight category. She won a bronze medal for the 57 kg class at the 2007 Pan American Games in Rio de Janeiro, Brazil.

Mestre represented Cuba at the 2008 Summer Olympics in Beijing, where she competed for the women's half-lightweight class (52 kg). She lost the first preliminary match to North Korea's An Kum-Ae, who scored a waza-ari-awasete-ippon before the start of the second minute. Because her opponent advanced further into the final match against China's Xian Dongmei, Mestre offered another shot for a bronze medal through the repechage, where she was defeated by Venezuela's Flor Velázquez, who only scored a single koka within a five-minute period.

References

External links

NBC 2008 Olympics profile

Living people
Olympic judoka of Cuba
Judoka at the 2008 Summer Olympics
Sportspeople from Havana
1983 births
Cuban female judoka
Pan American Games bronze medalists for Cuba
Pan American Games medalists in judo
Judoka at the 2007 Pan American Games
Medalists at the 2007 Pan American Games
20th-century Cuban women
21st-century Cuban women